Pterostemonaceae (Engl.) Small is a small family of shrubs native to tropical and subtropical Mexico. The family was recognized by scientists working with the Angiosperm Phylogeny Group but is placed in the Grossulariaceae by other taxonomic systems. The APG II system recognized the family as containing a single genus, Pterostemon. The APG III system of 2009, and later versions, do not recognize this family and place Pterostemon within the Iteaceae in the order Saxifragales.

References
Pterostemonaceae in Stevens, P. F. (2001 onwards). 

Saxifragales families
Monogeneric plant families
Flora of Mexico
Historically recognized angiosperm families